Bhopali is a Hindustani classical raga or melody

Bhopali may also refer to:

 Bhopali, Bhiwani, a village in the Bhiwani district of the Indian state of Haryana
 Bhopali, the demonym for natives of the Indian city of Bhopal

People with the surname
 Asad Bhopali (1921–1990),Indian poet and lyricist
 Kaif Bhopali (1917–1991), Indian Urdu poet and lyricist
 Manzar Bhopali (born 1959), Indian Urdu poet
 Mohamed Barakatullah Bhopali (1854–1927), Indian revolutionary and the first prime minister of the Provisional Government of India
 Mohsin Bhopali (1932–2007), Pakistani poet and travel writer
 Shakeela Bano Bhopali (1942–2002), film actress and the first women Qawwal of India

See also 
 Bhopal (disambiguation)